Nick Benedict (born July 14, 1947 in Los Angeles) is an American actor. He is perhaps best known for his roles on daytime soap operas.

His father is actor and director Richard Benedict. He made his debut in 1955 in the series  Wiretapper as a child. His first performance as an adult was in Mike and the Mermaid at the age of 17.  In 1969 he appeared in the Mission Impossible TV series episode, The Vault.  He had his first significant role as star-crossed Vietnam veteran Philip Brent on the ABC soap opera All My Children, he would play the role for six years and earned Daytime Emmy Award nomination during his last year on the show. From 1980-1981 he played Michael Scott on The Young and the Restless. From 1982-1983, he played Ron Washington on Another Life. He appeared on The Dukes Of Hazzard, as Frank James, in the seventh-season episode Go West, Young Dukes.  He played the attorney Michael Fox in the 1985 Tales from the Darkside episode "Madness Room". In 1990 he starred alongside Nancy Allen in the TV film Memories of a Murder. He played the role of Curtis Reed in Days of Our Lives on and off between 1993 and 2001. In the 1990s he mainly appeared in films aside from his ongoing role in Days of our Lives. His last screen appearance was minor role in George Santo Pietro's Kept in 2001.

References

External links

American male film actors
American male television actors
1947 births
Living people
Male actors from Los Angeles